The 5 arrondissements of the Aisne department are:
 Arrondissement of Château-Thierry, (subprefecture: Château-Thierry) with 108 communes. The population of the arrondissement was 71,417 in 2016.  
 Arrondissement of Laon, (prefecture of the Aisne department: Laon) with 240 communes. The population of the arrondissement was 157,371 in 2016.  
 Arrondissement of Saint-Quentin, (subprefecture: Saint-Quentin, Aisne) with 126 communes.  The population of the arrondissement was 129,028 in 2016.  
 Arrondissement of Soissons, (subprefecture: Soissons) with 164 communes.  The population of the arrondissement was 107,744 in 2016.
 Arrondissement of Vervins, (subprefecture: Vervins) with 160 communes.  The population of the arrondissement was 72,157 in 2016.

History

In 1800 the arrondissements of Laon, Château-Thierry, Saint-Quentin, Soissons and Vervins were established. The arrondissement of Château-Thierry was disbanded in 1926, and restored in 1942. 

The borders of the arrondissements of Aisne were modified in January 2017:
 10 communes from the arrondissement of Château-Thierry to the arrondissement of Soissons
 three communes from the arrondissement of Laon to the arrondissement of Soissons
 30 communes from the arrondissement of Laon to the arrondissement of Vervins

References

Aisne